Vision Thing  may refer to:

 Vision Thing (album), a 1990 album by The Sisters of Mercy
 "Vision Thing", a song by Simple Minds from their upcoming 2022 album Direction of the Heart
 "The Vision Thing", a season 12 episode of NYPD Blue
 "The vision thing", a comment made by George H. W. Bush ahead of the 1988 presidential election when urged to spend some time thinking about his plans for his prospective presidency.

See also
 "That Vision Thing", an episode of Angel